Anwar Sadath (born 18 February 1975) is an Indian politician and a member of the 15th Kerala Legislative Assembly. He is a member of Indian National Congress and represents Aluva Constituency.

Early life 
Anwar Sadath was born on 18 February 1975 as the son of Shri. Abdul Sathar and Smt. Aisha Beevi. He was School Unit President, K.S.U and School Leader. He progressed to become the District Level; Taluk Secretary and District Executive Committee Member of K.S.U and later on he became the Block Secretary, District Secretary and State Secretary of Youth Congress. He also became a Member of the Chengamanad Grama Panchayat and Zilla Panchayat, Nedumbassery Division.

Political career 
In the 2011 assembly election, he defeated AM Yusuf of the CPI (M). In the 2016 Kerala Assembly election he defeated Advocate V. Salim  by 18835 votes and was re-elected as an MLA. In 2021, Anwar Sadath has won from Aluva, defeating Ar Shelna Nishad, and is the Chief Whip of UDF (opposition party) 15th Kerala Legislative Assembly.

References

Living people
1975 births
People from Aluva
Kerala MLAs 2016–2021
Kerala MLAs 2011–2016
Indian National Congress politicians from Kerala
Politicians from Kochi